Sphenomorphus sarasinorum  is a species of skink found in Indonesia.

References

sarasinorum
Reptiles described in 1897
Taxa named by George Albert Boulenger
Reptiles of Sulawesi